Folklore is the ninth studio album by the English progressive rock band Big Big Train. Released on 27 May 2016, it was recorded at English Electric Studios, produced by Big Big Train, and mixed and mastered at Aubitt Studios by Rob Aubrey. It is the first studio album to feature Rachel Hall and then-Beardfish lead vocalist Rikard Sjöblom as official members.

The album was released in multiple formats: standard and High Res downloads, as a single CD, and as a double-LP vinyl release that features two additional tracks, "Mudlarks" and "Lost Rivers of London", both of which were previously released on the 2015 EP Wassail. Both versions of the album contain the title track from Wassail, meaning that the vinyl release features all three of the original songs on the EP.

Reception
Reviews were largely positive for this release, the ProgReport saying "from the first listen is so breathtaking and magnificent, that more listens are welcomed". Concluding with "All in all, this is a sprawling collection of brilliantly told stories with even more impressive music".

Track listing

CD Release

Vinyl Release

*Vinyl-only tracks (though both were previously released on CD on the band's 2015 EP Wassail)

Personnel
 David Longdon - lead vocals, flute, acoustic guitar, mandolin, percussion
 Nick D'Virgilio - drums, percussion, backing vocals
 Greg Spawton - bass guitar, bass pedals, acoustic guitar, backing vocals
 Andy Poole - acoustic guitar, mandolin, keyboards, backing vocals
 Dave Gregory - electric guitars
 Danny Manners - keyboards, double bass
 Rachel Hall - violin, viola, cello, backing vocals
 Rikard Sjöblom - electric guitars, keyboards, accordion, backing vocals

References

External links
 Bigbigtrain.com Discography
 Prog magazine review, 4 May 2016

Big Big Train albums
2016 albums